The Colda was a French automobile manufactured from 1921 until 1922. The company was based in Paris; the cars were built with an 1847cc four-cylinder engine produced by Sergant.

References
David Burgess Wise, The New Illustrated Encyclopedia of Automobiles.

Defunct motor vehicle manufacturers of France
Manufacturing companies based in Paris